JDS Yūgumo (DD-121) was the sixth ship of Yamagumo-class destroyers.

Construction and career
Yūgumo was laid down at Sumitomo Heavy Industries Uraga Shipyard on 4 February 1976 and launched on 21 May 1977. It was commissioned on 24 March 1978.

On March 27, 1982, it was transferred to the 23rd Escort Corps of the 4th Escort Corps, and the home port was transferred to Ominato.

On January 31, 1990, the 23rd Escort Corps was reorganized under the control of the Ominato District Force.

Engaged in disaster dispatch activities due to the Hokkaido Nansei-oki Earthquake that occurred on July 12, 1993.

On March 24, 1997, the 23rd escort corps was renamed to the 25th escort corps due to the revision of the corps number.

Engaged in disaster relief due to the eruption of Mount Usu that occurred on March 31, 2000.

Removed from the register on June 17, 2005. The total cruising range was about 652,372 nautical miles (about 30 laps of the earth).

Citations

References 

1973 ships
Yamagumo-class destroyers
Ships built by Sumitomo Heavy Industries